Petar Kovachev (born 10 July 1922) was a Bulgarian cross-country skier who competed in the 1950s. He competed at the 1952 Winter Olympics in Oslo in the 4 x 10 km relay, but one of his teammates did not finish. He also finished 60th in the 18 km event. He competed for Ski Club Slavia Sofia. From 1958 he was a member of the Central Ski-Section, which was transformed to Bulgarian Ski Federation in 1961. From 1967 he was the first chairman of the Committee for ski jumping and northern combined at the federation for a period of 10 years, and from 1968 he was a member of the Committee for cross country.

References

External links
Answers.com information on 1952 Winter Olympics men's 4 x 10 km relay
Petar Kovachev's profile at Sports Reference.com

1922 births
Possibly living people
Bulgarian male cross-country skiers
Cross-country skiers at the 1952 Winter Olympics
Olympic cross-country skiers of Bulgaria